Gnosticism in modern times includes a variety of contemporary religious movements, stemming from Gnostic ideas and systems from ancient Roman society. Gnosticism is an ancient name for a variety of religious ideas and systems, originating in Jewish-Christian milieux in the first and second century CE.

The Mandaeans are an ancient Gnostic ethnoreligious group that have survived and are found today in Iran, Iraq and diaspora communities in North America, Western Europe and Australia.

The late 19th century saw the publication of popular sympathetic studies making use of recently rediscovered source materials. In this period there was also the revival of a Gnostic religious movement in France. The emergence of the Nag Hammadi library in 1945 greatly increased the amount of source material available. Its translation into English and other modern languages in 1977 resulted in a wide dissemination, and as a result had observable influence on several modern figures, and upon modern Western culture in general. This article attempts to summarize those modern figures and movements that have been influenced by Gnosticism, both prior and subsequent to the Nag Hammadi discovery.

A number of ecclesiastical bodies that identify as Gnostic have set up or re-founded since World War II as well, including the Ecclesia Gnostica, Johannite Church, Ecclesia Gnostica Catholica, the Thomasine Church (not to be confused with the St. Thomas Christians of India), the Alexandrian Gnostic Church, and the North American College of Gnostic Bishops.

Late 19th century
Source materials were discovered in the 18th century. In 1769, the Bruce Codex was brought to England from Upper Egypt by the Scottish traveller James Bruce, and subsequently bequeathed to the care of the Bodleian Library, Oxford. Sometime prior to 1785, The Askew Codex (a.k.a. Pistis Sophia) was bought by the British Museum from the heirs of Dr. Askew. The Pistis Sophia text and Latin translation of the Askew Codex by M. G. Schwartze were published in 1851. Although discovered in 1896, the Coptic Berlin Codex (a.k.a. the Akhmim Codex) was not 'rediscovered' until the 20th century.

Charles William King
Charles William King was a British writer and collector of ancient gemstones with magical inscriptions. His collection was sold because of his failing eyesight, and was presented in 1881 to the Metropolitan Museum of Art, New York. King was recognized as one of the greatest authorities on gems at the time.

In The Gnostics and their Remains (1864, 1887 2nd ed.) King sets out to show that rather than being a Western heresy, the origins of Gnosticism are to be found in the East, specifically in Buddhism. This theory was embraced by Blavatsky, who argued that it was plausible, but rejected by G. R. S. Mead. According to Mead, King's work "lacks the thoroughness of the specialist."

Madame Blavatsky
Helena Petrovna Blavatsky, co-founder of the Theosophical Society, wrote extensively on Gnostic ideas. A compilation of her writings on Gnosticism is over 270 pages long. The first edition of King's The Gnostics and Their Remains was repeatedly cited as a source and quoted in Isis Unveiled.

G. R. S. Mead
G. R. S. Mead became a member of Blavatsky's Theosophical Society in 1884. He left the teaching profession in 1889 to become Blavatsky's private secretary, which he was until her death in 1891. Mead's interest in Gnosticism was likely awakened by Blavatsky who discussed it at length in Isis Unveiled.

In 1890–1891 Mead published a serial article on Pistis Sophia in Lucifer magazine, the first English translation of that work. In an article in 1891, Mead argues for the recovery of the literature and thought of the West at a time when Theosophy was largely directed to the East, saying that this recovery of Western antique traditions is a work of interpretation and "the rendering of tardy justice to pagans and heretics, the reviled and rejected pioneers of progress..." This was the direction his own work was to take.

The first edition of his translation of Pistis Sophia appeared in 1896. From 1896–1898 Mead published another serial article in the same periodical, "Among the Gnostics of the First Two Centuries," that laid the foundation for his monumental compendium Fragments of a Faith Forgotten in 1900. Mead serially published translations from the Corpus Hermeticum from 1900–1905. The next year he published Thrice-Greatest Hermes, a massive, comprehensive three volume treatise. His series Echoes of the Gnosis was published in 12 booklets in 1908. By the time he left the Theosophical Society in 1909, he had published many influential translations, commentaries, and studies of ancient Gnostic texts. "Mead made Gnosticism accessible to the intelligent public outside of academia". Mead's work has had and continues to have widespread influence.

The Gnostic Church revival in France
After a series of visions and archival finds of Cathar-related documents, a librarian named Jules-Benoît Stanislas Doinel du Val-Michel (a.k.a. Jules Doinel) established the Église Gnostique (French: Gnostic Church). Founded on extant Cathar documents with the Gospel of John and strong influence of Simonian and Valentinian cosmology, the church was officially established in the autumn of 1890 in Paris, France. Doinel declared it "the era of Gnosis restored." Liturgical services were based on Cathar rituals. Clergy was both male and female, having male bishops and female "sophias."

Doinel resigned and converted to Roman Catholicism in 1895, one of many duped by Léo Taxil's anti-masonic hoax. Taxil unveiled the hoax in 1897. Doinel was readmitted to the Gnostic church as a bishop in 1900.

Early to mid-20th century

Carl Jung
Carl Gustav Jung evinced a special interest in Gnosticism from at least 1912, when he wrote enthusiastically about the topic in a letter to Freud. After what he called his own 'encounter with the unconscious,' Jung sought for external evidence of this kind of experience. He found such evidence in Gnosticism, and also in alchemy, which he saw as a continuation of Gnostic thought, and of which more source material was available. In his study of the Gnostics, Jung made extensive use of the work of GRS Mead. Jung visited Mead in London to thank him for the Pistis Sophia, the two corresponded, and Mead visited Jung in Zürich.

Jung saw the Gnostics not as syncretic schools of mixed theological doctrines, but as genuine visionaries, and saw their imagery not as myths but as records of inner experience. He wrote that "The explanation of Gnostic ideas 'in terms of themselves,' i.e., in terms of their historical foundations, is futile, for in that way they are reduced only to their less developed forestages but not understood in their actual significance." Instead, he worked to understand and explain Gnosticism from a psychological standpoint. While providing something of an ancient mirror of his work, Jung saw "his psychology not as a contemporary version of Gnosticism, but as a contemporary counterpart to it."

Jung reported a series of experiences in the winter of 1916-17 that inspired him to write Septem Sermones ad Mortuos (Latin: Seven Sermons to the Dead).

The Jung Codex 

Through the efforts of Gilles Quispel, the Jung Codex was the first codex brought to light from the Nag Hammadi Library. It was purchased by the Jung Institute and ceremonially presented to Jung in 1953 because of his great interest in the ancient Gnostics. The first publication of translations of Nag Hammadi texts occurred in 1955 with the Jung Codex by H. Puech, Gilles Quispel, and W. Van Unnik.

French Gnostic Church split, reintegration, and continuation
In 1907 Bricaud established a church body that combined all of these, becoming patriarch under the name Tau Jean II. The impetus for this was to use the Western Rite. Briefly called the Église Catholique Gnostique (Gnostic Catholic Church), it was renamed the Église Gnostique Universelle (Universal Gnostic Church, EGU) in 1908. The close ties between the church and Martinism were formalized in 1911. Bricaud received consecration in the Villate line of apostolic succession in 1919.

The original church body founded by Doinel continued under the name Église Gnostique de France (Gnostic Church of France) until it was disbanded in favor of the EGU in 1926. The EGU continued until 1960 when it was disbanded by Robert Amberlain (Tau Jean III) in favor of the Église Gnostique Apostolique that he had founded in 1958. It is active in France (including Martinique), Ivory Coast, and the Midwestern United States.

Modern sex magic associated with Gnosticism
The use of the term 'gnostic' by sexual magic groups is a modern phenomenon. Hugh Urban concludes that, "despite the very common use of sexual symbolism throughout Gnostic texts, there is little evidence (apart from the accusations of the early church) that the Gnostics engaged in any actual performance of sexual rituals, and certainly not anything resembling modern sexual magic." Modern sexual magic began with Paschal Beverly Randolph. The connection to Gnosticism came by way of the French Gnostic Church with its close ties to the strong esoteric current in France, being part of the same highly interconnected milieu of esoteric societies and orders from which the most influential of sexual magic orders arose, the Ordo Templi Orientis (Order of Oriental Templars, OTO).

Theodor Reuss founded the OTO as an umbrella occult organization with sexual magic at its core. After Reuss came into contact with French Gnostic Church leaders at a Masonic and Spiritualist conference in 1908, he founded Die Gnostische Katholische Kirche (the Gnostic Catholic Church), under the auspices of the OTO. Reuss subsequently dedicated the OTO to the promulgation of Crowley's philosophy of Thelema. It is for this church body, called in Latin the Ecclesia Gnostica Catholica (EGC), that Aleister Crowley wrote the Ecclesiæ Gnosticæ Catholicæ Canon Missæ ("Canon of the Mass of the Gnostic Catholic Church"), the central ritual of the OTO that is now commonly called the Gnostic Mass.

The Gnostic Society

The Gnostic Society, was founded for the study of Gnosticism in 1928 and incorporated in 1939 by Theosophists James Morgan Pryse and his brother John Pryse in Los Angeles. Since 1963 it has been under the direction of Stephan Hoeller and operates in association with the Ecclesia Gnostica. Initially begun as an archive for a usenet newsgroup in 1993, the Gnosis Archive became the first web site to offer historic and source materials on Gnosticism.

Mid-20th century

The Gospel of Thomas, held to be the most complete of the Nag Hammadi texts, is the subject of the book The Mustard Seed by Indian mystic Bhagwan Shree Rajneesh, also known as Osho.

Ecclesia Gnostica
Established in 1953 by Richard Duc de Palatine in England under the name 'the Pre-nicene Gnostic Catholic Church', the Ecclesia Gnostica (Latin: "Church of Gnosis" or "Gnostic Church") is said to represent 'the English Gnostic tradition', although it has ties to, and has been influenced by, the French Gnostic church tradition. It is affiliated with the Gnostic Society, an organization dedicated to the study of Gnosticism. The presiding bishop is the Rt. Rev. Stephan A. Hoeller, who has written extensively on Gnosticism.

Centered in Los Angeles, the Ecclesia Gnostica has parishes and educational programs of the Gnostic Society spanning the Western US and also in the Kingdom of Norway. The lectionary and liturgical calendar of the Ecclesia Gnostica have been widely adopted by subsequent Gnostic churches, as have the liturgical services in use by the church, though in somewhat modified forms.

Ecclesia Gnostica Mysteriorum 
The Ecclesia Gnostica Mysteriorum (EGM), commonly known as "the Church of Gnosis" or "the Gnostic Sanctuary," was initially established in Palo Alto by bishop Rosamonde Miller as a parish of the Ecclesia Gnostica, but soon became an independent body with emphasis on the experience of gnosis and the balance of the divine masculine and feminine principles. The Gnostic Sanctuary is now located in Redwood City, California. The EGM also claims a distinct lineage of Mary Magdalene from a surviving tradition in France.

Samael Aun Weor in South America
Samael Aun Weor had been a member of an occult order called the Fraternitas Rosicruciana Antiqua, but left after the death of Arnold Krumm-Heller. He reported an experience of being called to his new mission by the venerable White Lodge (associated with Theosophy). Samael Aun Weor taught a "New Gnosis," consisting of sexual union between man and woman, without the ejaculation of the sexual liquid. He called this the Arcanum AZF. For him it is "the synthesis of all religions, schools and sects."

Moving through Latin America, he finally settled in Mexico where he founded the Movimiento Gnostico Cristiano Universal (MGCU) (Universal Gnostic Christian Movement), then subsequently founded the Iglesia Gnostica Cristiana Universal (Universal Gnostic Christian Church) and the Associacion Gnostica de Estudios Antropologicos Culturales y Cientificos (AGEAC) (Gnostic Association of Scientific, Cultural and Anthropological Studies) to spread his teachings.

The MGCU became defunct by the time of Samael Aun Weor's death in December 1977. However, his disciples subsequently formed new organizations to spread his teachings, under the umbrella term 'the International Gnostic Movement'. These organizations are currently very active via the Internet and have centers established in Latin America, the US, Australia, Canada and Europe.

Hans Jonas
The philosopher Hans Jonas wrote extensively on Gnosticism, interpreting it from an existentialist viewpoint. For some time, his study The Gnostic Religion: The message of the alien God and the beginnings of Christianity published in 1958, was widely held to be a pivotal work, and it is as a result of his efforts that the Syrian-Egyptian/Persian division of Gnosticism came to be widely used within the field. The second edition, published in 1963, included the essay "Gnosticism, Existentialism, and Nihilism."

Eric Voegelin's anti-modernist 'gnostic thesis'
In the 1950s, Eric Voegelin brought a German academic debate concerning the classification of modernity to the attention of English-language readers. He responded to Karl Löwith's 1949 Meaning in History: the Theological Implications of the Philosophy of History and Jacob Taubes's 1947 Occidental Eschatology. Voegelin put forward his version of a "gnosticism thesis": criticizing modernity by identifying an "immanentist eschatology" as the "gnostic nature" of modernity. Differing with Löwith, he did not criticize eschatology as such, but rather the immanentization which he described as a "pneumopathological" deformation. Voegelin's gnosticism thesis became popular in American neo-conservative and cold war political thought. The category of gnosticism has been adopted by other scholars to frame several revolutionary phenomena (such as Bolshevism and Nazism, Puritanism, radical Anabaptism, Jacobinism, and lastly Salafi-Jihadism).

Gnosticism in popular culture
Gnosticism has seen something of a resurgence in popular culture in the late 20th and early 21st centuries. This may be related, certainly, to the sudden availability of Gnostic texts to the reading public, following the emergence of the Nag Hammadi library.

 Philip K. Dick explored gnosticism in many of his later works, particularly the VALIS trilogy.
Polish Nobel's laureate Olga Tokarczuk depicts worlds that strongly resemble one known from the Gnostic cosmogony. Notable examples are Primeval and Other Times and House of Day, House of Night.
 Blood Meridian by American author Cormac McCarthy features several Gnostic elements.
  A Little World Made Cunningly Paperback – September 1, 2013 by Scott David Finch (Author, Illustrator)
 Legacy of Kain: Soul Reaver was said by director Amy Hennig to have been inspired by Gnosticism.
 The Atlus video game series Persona extensively uses Gnostic terms and concepts.
 Fringe theories presented by David Icke refer to a humanoid reptilian race as Archons.
 Catholic priest Alfonso Aguilar has described Star Wars, Harry Potter, and The Matrix as embodying Gnostic views, as "two signs of the power of the real enemy: Gnosticism" and stressting the need to "examine their philosophical background and reject what is incompatible with our Christian faith."
 In The Matrix, Morpheus offering Neo the truth and asking him to choose between a blue or red pill symbolizing materialistic relativism and secret knowledge respectively, which has been compared to Gnosticism in scholarly criticism.

See also
Gnostic churches:
Ecclesia Gnostica
Johannite Church
Ecclesia Gnostica Catholica
Ecclesia Pistis Sophia
Gnostic Church of France
Jungian interpretation of religion

Notes

References 

 Jonas, Hans (1966). “Gnosticism, Existentialism, and Nihilism.” In The Phenomenon of Life: Toward a Philosophical Biology, University of Chicago Press.

 Lasch, Christopher. "Gnosticism, Ancient and Modern: The Religion of the Future?," Salmagundi, No. 96, Fall 1992.

 O’Reagan, Cyril (2001). Gnostic Return in Modernity, SUNY Press.

 Rossbach, Stefan (2000). Gnostic Wars, Edinburgh University Press.

 Versluis, Arthur (2006). "Eric Voegelin, Anti-Gnosticism, and the Totalitarian Emphasis on Order." In The New Inquisitions: Heretic-Hunting and the Intellectual Origins of Modern Totalitarianism, Oxford University Press.
 Voegelin, Eric (1956). Order and History, Louisiana State University Press.
 Voegelin, Eric (1968). Science, Politics, and Gnosticism: Two Essays, Regnery Gateway.
 Voegelin, Eric (1987). The New Science of Politics, University Of Chicago Press.

Further reading

External links

"The Gnostics and their Remains" - online text of the book
Extensive on-line collection of the writings of GRS Mead (at the Gnosis Archive)
The Gnostic Society Library

Gnosticism